North Arlington is the name of two places in the United States:

 North Arlington, New Jersey.
 North Arlington School District
 North Arlington High School
 North Arlington, Virginia, an unincorporated community in Arlington County, Virginia